Richard A. Devine (born July 5, 1943) is an American attorney who served as the Cook County State's Attorney from 1996 to 2008.

Early life and education
The second of five children, he was the son of a Chicago Water Department employee. Devine grew up in Rogers Park, Chicago, and played football and basketball at Loyola Academy in Wilmette, Illinois. He attended John Carroll University for one year on a football scholarship but returned home when his father's health worsened after a stroke.
In 1966, Devine graduated from Loyola University Chicago with a Bachelor of Arts degree before earning a Juris Doctor from the Northwestern University Pritzker School of Law in 1968.

Career
Devine worked as an aide to Chicago mayor Richard J. Daley in 1968 and 1969. Devine worked then as a legal advisor to Daley from 1969 to 1972. He then served as the first assistant state's attorney's office under Richard M. Daley from 1980 to 1983. He was President of the Chicago Park District from 1990 to 1993, and a member of the court-reform commission created in the wake of the Operation Greylord.

Devine was elected in 1996 as the Cook County State's Attorney, unseating incumbent Republican Jack O'Malley in an upset victory. He served for 12 years until 2008, when he did not seek re-election. He was succeeded by Anita Alvarez.

Devine appeared in Surviving R. Kelly, a 2019 Lifetime documentary series about sexual abuse allegations against musician R. Kelly. Though the 2008 trial of Kelly occurred at the end of Devine's tenure, he did not participate in the trial.

Personal life
Devine has been married to Charlene Devine for over 50 years and they have four adult children.

References

1943 births
Living people
District attorneys in Illinois
Illinois lawyers
Politicians from Chicago
Loyola University Chicago alumni
Northwestern University Pritzker School of Law alumni
Loyola University Chicago School of Law faculty